Daska , is a tehsil in Sialkot District, Punjab, Pakistan. Its capital is Daska city.

Localities
Bambanwala
[Adamke Cheema]

References

Sialkot District
Tehsils of Punjab, Pakistan